The Super Bowl of Poker (also known as Amarillo Slim's Super Bowl of Poker or SBOP) was the second most prestigious poker tournament in the world during the 1980s.  While the World Series of Poker was already drawing larger crowds as more and more amateurs sought it out, the SBOP "was an affair limited almost exclusively to pros and hard-core amateurs."

Prior to 1979, the only high dollar tournament a person could enter was the WSOP.  1972 WSOP Main Event Champion and outspoken ambassador for poker Amarillo Slim saw this as an opportunity.  "The World Series of Poker was so successful that everybody wanted more than one tournament," he said.  Slim called upon his connections and friendships with poker's elite to start a new tournament in the February 1979.  Before the SBOP had developed a reputation of its own, many of the most respected names in poker attended the tournament "more to support Slim and take advantage of the very fat cash games the event would obviously inspire."  Slim modelled his SBOP after the WSOP with several events and a $10,000 Texas Hold'em Main Event.

One of the principal differences between the WSOP and the SBOP was the prize structure.  The WSOP's prize structure was flat ensuring more people received smaller pieces of the prize pool.  The SBOP typically used a 60-30-10 payout structure.  In other words, only the first three places received money and generally in the ratio of 60% to first place, 30% to second place, and 10% to third.  This payment schedule predominated the SBOP for the first 5 years of the event, but as the event grew the number of payouts increased while keeping the payout schedule top heavy.

1979 Tournament

As one of the original participants in the WSOP, the 1979 tournament was built upon Amarillo Slim's popularity and reputation.  Many of the biggest names showed up at the event.  Despite the limited number of cash prizes offered at the SBOP, Poker Hall of Famer Johnny Moss succeeded in making it to the cash 4 times.  Doyle Brunson, another Hall of Famer, finished in second place in the $1,000 Ace to five Lowball event.  2003 Poker Hall of Fame inductee Bobby Baldwin won the $5,000 Seven card Stud event.

Key

Event 1: $ 10,000 No Limit Hold'em 

 Number of buy-ins: 30
 Total prize pool: $300,000
 Number of payouts: 7
 Reference:

Event 2: $ 10,000 No Limit Deuce-to-Seven Draw 

 Number of buy-ins: Unknown
 Total prize pool:  Unknown
 Number of payouts: 2
 Reference:

Event 3: $ 200 Ladies Seven Card Stud 

 Number of buy-ins: 53
 Total prize pool:  $10,600
 Number of payouts: 3
 Reference:

Event 4: $ 1,000 Ace to five Lowball 

 Number of buy-ins: 45
 Total prize pool:  $45,000
 Number of payouts: 3
 Reference:

Event 5: $ 1,000 Seven card Stud 

 Number of buy-ins: 44
 Total prize pool:  $44,000
 Number of payouts: 3
 Reference:

Event 6: $ 5,000 Seven card Stud 

 Number of buy-ins: 11
 Total prize pool:  $55,000
 Number of payouts: 3
 Reference:

Event 7: $ 1,000 Razz 

 Number of buy-ins: 33
 Total prize pool:  $33,000
 Number of payouts: 3
 Reference:

Event 8: $ 5,000 Razz 

 Number of buy-ins: 11
 Total prize pool:  $55,000
 Number of payouts: 3
 Reference:

Event 9: $ 2,500 Seven Card Stud Hi/Lo Split 

 Number of buy-ins: 15
 Total prize pool:  $37,500
 Number of payouts: 3
 Reference:

Event 10: $ 10,000 Deuce to Seven Lowball 

 Number of buy-ins: 11
 Total prize pool:  $55,000
 Number of payouts: 3
 Reference:

Event 11: $ 1,000 Hold'em 

 Number of buy-ins: 130
 Total prize pool:  $130,000
 Number of payouts: 3
 Reference:

References

Super Bowl of Poker
1979 in poker